"L'Affiche rouge" is a song from the album Les Chansons d'Aragon (1961) by Léo Ferré. Its lyrics are based on the poem Strophes pour se souvenir (Strophes to remember) which Louis Aragon wrote in 1955 for the inauguration of a street in the 20th arrondissement in Paris, named "rue du Groupe Manouchian" in honor of 23 members of the FTP-MOI executed by the Nazis in the Mont-Valérien. The affair became known by the name of the Affiche rouge ("Red Poster") because the Germans plastered Paris in the spring of 1944 with thousands of red posters denouncing those executed as immigrants and Resistants.

The poem paraphrases Missak Manouchian's last letter to his wife.

External links 
 Poem in French and English
 Song performed by Léo Ferré  (Daily Motion)

Léo Ferré songs
French Resistance
French poems
1955 poems
1959 songs
Affiche Rouge
Works by Louis Aragon